Haldia Law College is a college imparting legal education in Haldia, West Bengal. It was established in the year 2002. The college is affiliated to Vidyasagar University. This college is also approved by the Bar Council of India.

Courses 
The college offers a five-years integrated B.A. LL.B. (Hons.) course, three-years LL.B. course and two years LL.M. (Master of Laws) course also.

See also

References

External links 
 Haldia Law College
Vidyasagar University
University Grants Commission
National Assessment and Accreditation Council

Law schools in West Bengal
Universities and colleges in Purba Medinipur district
Colleges affiliated to Vidyasagar University
Haldia
Educational institutions established in 2002
2002 establishments in West Bengal